Nannau is a historic summer estate house in Bar Harbor, Maine.  Located between Maine State Route 3 and overlooking Compass Harbor, this 1904 Shingle style house was built for David R. Ogden, a New York City lawyer, to designs by the Boston firm Andrews, Jaques and Rantoul.  The house was characterized in 1906 as "an excellent example of shingle work"; it was listed on the National Register of Historic Places in 1984.

Description and history 
Nannau is set on the south side of a private drive, south of the main village of Bar Harbor, and located between Maine State Route 3 and Compass Harbor, an inlet off Frenchman Bay.  It has a two-story rectangular main block, oriented northwest to southeast, with projecting ells at both ends.  It has a steeply-pitched hip roof, with projecting -story gable sections on the main land-side facade, flanking a smaller single-story entry portico with its own steeply-pitched hip roof with a flared edge.  The walls are finished in wood shingles.

Nannau was designed by the Boston architectural firm of Andrews, Jaques, and Rantoul, who were responsible for the design of a number of Bar Harbor's finest summer estates.  It was built in 1904 for David R. Ogden, a New York lawyer who helped found Saint Saviour's Church in Bar Harbor, and who gained a national reputation for his philanthropic work with the American Red Cross during the First World War.  The house was featured in a 1906 edition of The Country House, in which it was described as "an excellent example of shingle work".  The house in recent years was used as a bed and breakfast that is now closed. Currently it is a private residence.

See also 
National Register of Historic Places listings in Hancock County, Maine

References 

Houses on the National Register of Historic Places in Maine
Shingle Style architecture in Maine
Houses completed in 1904
Houses in Hancock County, Maine
National Register of Historic Places in Hancock County, Maine